HK Cafe is a Chinese restaurant in Portland, Oregon.

Description
HK Cafe is located in southeast Portland's Lents neighborhood. Ainslee Dicken of Portland Monthly has described HK Cafe as a "sprawling, gaudily decorated restaurant offering an abundance of small dishes". Ben Waterhouse of The Oregonian said of the interior: "You won't find any fancy chandeliers or shark-fin displays here. HK Cafe's crowded dining room is brightly lit but spare, decorated with hanging paper lanterns and parasols."

The restaurant specializes in dim sum; specific menu items include bok choy, cha siu bao (barbecue pork buns), custard buns, har gow, noodles, radish cake, and shumai. The menu also includes beef short ribs in broth, salad with pig-ear, roast pork, deep-fried rice balls with sweet pork, and "Chinese sushi" (fish and shrimp wrapped in seaweed, breaded and fried).

History
The restaurant operated via take-out during the COVID-19 pandemic.

Reception
In 2013, Ben Waterhouse of The Oregonian said, "HK Cafe proves that even the bleakest of asphalt deserts can be home to great food." In 2020, Michael Russell included the restaurant in the newspaper's list of "Portland's 40 best inexpensive restaurants", and described HK Cafe as one of the city's busiest restaurants on weekends. Seiji Nanbu and Brooke Jackson-Glidden included HK Cafe in Eater Portland 2021 overview of "Where to Find Outstanding Chinese Takeout in Portland and Beyond". Portland Monthly included the dim sum in a 2022 list of "The 12 Best Breakfasts in Portland".

See also

 List of Chinese restaurants

References

External links

 

Chinese restaurants in Portland, Oregon
Lents, Portland, Oregon
Year of establishment missing